The 2010 World Sprint Speed Skating Championships was held between 16 January and 17 January 2010 at the Meiji Hokkaido-Tokachi Oval in Obihiro, Hokkaidō.

Men championships

Results 

NQ = Not qualified for the second 1000 m (only the best 24 are qualified)DQ = disqualifiedNS = Not StartedRET = Retreted

Women championships

Results 

NQ = Not qualified for the second 1000 m (only the best 24 are qualified)DQ = disqualified

Rules 
All participating skaters are allowed to skate the two 500 meters and one 1000 meters; 24 skaters may take part on the second 1000 meters. These 24 skaters are determined by the samalog standings after the three skated distances, and comparing these lists as follows:

 Skaters among the top 24 on both lists are qualified.
 To make up a total of 24, skaters are then added in order of their best rank on either list.

References

Official results

2010 World Sprint
2010 in speed skating
World Sprint, 2010
Sport in Hokkaido
2010 in Japanese sport